Valentin Belokhvostik (September 6, 1934 – June 10, 2003) was a  Belarusian and Soviet actor, Laureate of the State Prize of the BSSR (1989), and National Artist of the Republic of Belarus (1994).

Biography 
Belokhvostik graduated from the studio of the Yanka Kupala National Academic Theater in 1958, and from the Moscow State Institute of Theater Arts in 1965. He worked at the Yanka Kupala National Academic Theater and acted in films.

Films 

 1971 - Вчера,сегодня и всегда - Семен Карабанов, директор детского дома
 1972 - Tomorrow will be too late ... - Ivan Vasilievich, a commander of a partisan group
 1973 - A Thought about Kovpak - Commissioner Semyon Rudnev
 1977 - The Right to Love - Zadornov
 1985 - The Drummer's Tale - Leonid Schepkin, a midshipman and an orchestra leader

Personal life 
Daughter - Zoya Belokhvostik - actress
Father-in-law - Gleb Glebov - actor

References 

People's Artists of Belarus
21st-century Belarusian actors
20th-century Belarusian actors
Belarusian male actors
Soviet actors
2003 deaths
1934 births